Pierre Cottereau is a French cinematographer. He is most noted for his work on the 2011 film Café de Flore, for which he won the Jutra Award for Best Cinematography at the 14th Jutra Awards, and was a Genie Award nominee for Best Cinematography at the 32nd Genie Awards.

Filmography

References

External links

French cinematographers
Living people
Best Cinematography Jutra and Iris Award winners
Year of birth missing (living people)